A patent family is "a set of patents taken in various countries to protect a single invention (when a first application in a country – the priority – is then extended to other offices)." In other words, a patent family is "the same invention disclosed by a common inventor(s) and patented in more than one country." Patent families can be regarded as a "fortuitous by-product of the concept of priorities for patent applications".

Definitions 
The International Patent Documentation Centre (INPADOC), the European Patent Office (EPO) and WIPO recognize the following definitions of simple and extended patent families:

Simple patent family: All patent documents have exactly the same priority date or combination of priority dates.

Extended patent family: All patent documents are linked (directly or indirectly) via a priority document belonging to one patent family. The extended families allow for additional connectors to link other than strictly priority date. These include: domestic application numbers, countries that have not ratified the Paris Convention, or if the application was filed too late to claim priority.

Those are not the only possible definitions of a patent family, however. Another definition, which is broader than the "simple patent family" definition but narrower than the "extended patent family" definition, is to consider that "[a]ll the documents having at least one common priority belong to the same patent family."

In general, "[p]atent families are [effectively] defined by databases, not by national or international laws, and family members for a particular invention can vary from database to database."

Usage 
Scholars have exploited patent family information in a variety of ways. One notable use involves identifying "twin" patents, namely patent applications covering the same invention across multiple jurisdictions. In the same way that biology or psychology scholars use data on twins to perform twin studies, intellectual property scholars use data on patent twins to study the functioning of the patent system. For instance, twin studies have allowed researchers to compare quality across patent offices or to observe what appears to be a national preference in patent prosecution, in apparent violation of the national treatment principle (although the reasons for the observed effect are unclear). Another notable use of patent families is to impute missing data in patent databases.

See also 
 Continuing patent application
 Derwent World Patents Index patent family database
 Global Dossier
 INPADOC patent family database
 Triadic patent

References

External links
 Patent families on the Espacenet web site
 Patent families on the European Patent Office web site
 : "Patent family system"

Family, patent